William Robert Shepherd (12 June 1871 in Charleston, South Carolina – 7 June 1934 in Berlin, Germany) was an American cartographer and historian specializing in American and Latin American history.

In 1896, Shepherd completed his PhD at Columbia University. He then studied in Berlin and finally became professor of history at Columbia University. He is best known for his Historical Atlas, published in several editions during the early twentieth century. He is considered a pioneer in the field of Latin American history. Shepherd's address to the 1909 meeting of the American Historical Association was "probably the first time that a part of the program of the annual meeting was devoted to the history of other peoples in the Americas". In his remarks, he decried that in the United States the history of the western hemisphere focuses on the English colonies and ignores or disparages the history of Spanish, Portuguese, and French America. He called for a more balanced history of the Americas, stressing "That the history of the Spanish, Portuguese, and the French in America possesses an interest and a significance of its own, entirely apart from its relation to the 'Anglo-American' element."

Works
Guide to the Materials for the History of the United States in Spanish Archives. Washington, D.C., Carnegie Institution of Washington, 1907.
Historical Atlas. New York City, Henry Holt and Company, 1911.
The Story of New Amsterdam. New York, The Holland Society of New York, 1917.
The Hispanic Nations of the New World: Our Southern Neighbors. New Haven, Yale University Press, 1919.
Hispanic Nations of the New World; a chronicle of our southern neighbors, New Haven, Yale University Press, 1921.

Latin America. New York, Henry Holt and Company, 1923.
Historical Atlas. New York, Henry Holt and Company, 1926.
Distribution of Races in Austria-Hungary. 1911

See also

:Category:Historical maps by William R. Shepherd

References

Encyclopædia Britannica article

External links
 
 

1871 births
1934 deaths
American historians
American cartographers
Historians of Latin America
Latin Americanists
Columbia University faculty
Writers from Charleston, South Carolina